The 1992 Watford Borough Council election took place in 1992 to elect members of Watford Borough Council in England. This was the same day as other local elections.

Results summary

Ward results

Callowland

Central

Holywell

Leggats

Meriden

Nascot

Oxhey

Park

Stanborough

Tudor

Vicarage

Woodside

References

Watford
Watford Borough Council elections
1990s in Hertfordshire